Cold Mountain is the soundtrack for the Civil War film Cold Mountain (2003) starring Jude Law, Nicole Kidman, and Renée Zellweger. The album was nominated for two Grammy Awards and was produced by T Bone Burnett. Two songs were nominated for Academy Awards: "You Will Be My Ain True Love", written by Sting, and "The Scarlet Tide", written by Burnett and Elvis Costello. Both songs were sung by Alison Krauss.

The soundtrack consists of Appalachian, roots music, and old-time music to accompany the era of the movie. Jack White, of the rock band the White Stripes, performs five songs and appears as a troubadour in the movie.

Background 
When T Bone Burnett was looking for a young musician who understood the music of Cold Mountain, the person he came up with was Jack White, a rock guitarist from Detroit who had a deep interest in blues and bluegrass music. White was acquainted with two songs that appeared on the soundtrack. When he was fifteen, he played "Sitting on Top of the World", and years later he performed "The Wayfaring Stranger" with a band. Burnett and White met and talked about music and listened to Dock Boggs, Son House, Jimmie Rodgers, and Blind Willie Johnson.

With the help of John Cohen, a musicologist and founding member of the New Lost City Ramblers, Burnett continued his quest for experts on early American music. He found Dirk Powell, who played banjo, the Reeltime Travelers, an old-time music band from Tennessee, and Tim Eriksen, a vocalist and guitarist who was familiar with Sacred Harp music. The song "Idumea" is an example of Sacred Harp music, also known as shape note because the notes printed on the sheet music bear shapes, such as squares and triangles, to show changes in pitch. After rehearsing with the Sacred Harp singers in a studio, Burnett decided that the style was best heard in Liberty Baptist Church in Henagar, Alabama. The church's sixty-three member choir appeared on the soundtrack. "Lady Margaret", sung by choir member Cassie Franklin, appeared on the soundtrack but not in the movie.

Sting wrote "You Will Be My Ain True Love" for Cold Mountain, and it was sung by Alison Krauss. Burnett and Elvis Costello wrote "The Scarlet Tide", also sung by Krauss. Both songs received Academy Award nominations for Best Original Song and Grammy Award nominations for Best Song Written for Visual Media. The soundtrack reached No. 51 on the Billboard 200 chart. As of 2004, the soundtrack has sold 260,000 copies in United States. The DVD of the movie included a concert documentary with performances by some of the musicians who contributed to the soundtrack.

Awards and honors
 BAFTA Award for Best Film Music, T Bone Burnett, Gabriel Yared
 World Soundtrack Award for Best Original Score of the Year, Gabriel Yared
 Nomination, Academy Award for Best Original Score, Gabriel Yared
 Nomination, Academy Award for Best Original Song, "The Scarlet Tide", written by T Bone Burnett and Elvis Costello, sung by Alison Krauss
 Nomination, Academy Award for Best Original Song, "You Will Be My Ain True Love", written by Sting, sung by Alison Krauss
 Nomination, Grammy Award for Best Compilation Soundtrack Album for a Motion Picture, Television or Other Visual Media
 Nomination, Golden Globe Award for Best Original Song, "You Will Be My Ain True Love", Sting, Alison Krauss

Track listing

Personnel 

 Alison Krauss – vocals
 Jack White – guitar, vocals
 Dirk Powell – banjo
 Stuart Duncan – fiddle
 Gabriel Yared – piano
 Simon Chamberlain – piano
 Keith Ciancia – piano
 Nick Bucknall – clarinet
 David Theodore – oboe
 David Schnaufer – dulcimer
 Norman Blake  – mandolin
 Dennis Crouch – double bass
 Martin Tillman – cello
 Rolf Wilson – violin
 Patrick Warren – harmonium
 Susan Bohling – Cor Anglais
 Riley Baugus – vocal harmony
 Tim Eriksen – vocal harmony
 Cassie Franklin – vocal harmony
 Brendan Gleeson – vocal harmony
 Sting – vocal harmony
 Cheryl White – vocal harmony
 Reeltime Travelers
 Sacred Harp Singers
 Tim O'Brien
 Heidi Andrade
 Roy Andrade
 Martha Scanlan
 Brandon Story
 Thomas Sneed

Production

 T Bone Burnett – producer
 Anthony Minghella – executive producer
 Bob Neuwirth – associate music producer
 Gabriel Yared – orchestration, score producer
 John Bell – orchestration
 Nick Ingman – orchestration
 Kevin Townsend – orchestration
 Harry Rabinowitz – conductor
 David Hartley – arranger
 Ralph Stanley – arranger
 Simon Osborne – engineer
 Mike Piersante – engineer, mixing
 John Richards – engineer, mixing
 Gavin Lurssen – mastering

References 

2003 soundtrack albums
Albums produced by T Bone Burnett
Appalachian music
Old-time music
Sacred Harp